Maxim Lifontov (born 30 December 1986) is a Kazakh rugby union player. He plays as a fullback.

He currently plays for the Russian professional team of Yenisey-STM Krasnoyarsk.

Lifontov is an international player for Kazakhstan. He was the top scorer in the 2008 inaugural Asian Five Nations. He also played in the 2011 Rugby World Cup qualification, where his National Team reached the repechage, being eliminated by Uruguay, in a 44-7 defeat at 17 July 2010, in Montevideo. He was once more the top scorer at the 2011 Asian Five Nations, with 54 points.

Notes

External links
Maxim Lifontov at the 2011 Rugby World Cup qualifyings

1986 births
Living people
Rugby union fullbacks
Kazakhstani rugby union players
Kazakhstani expatriate rugby union players
Expatriate rugby union players in Russia
Kazakhstani expatriates in Russia